Koltsov (masculine) or Koltsova (feminine) is a common Russian surname. It derives from the Russian nickname "Koltso".

It is shared by the following people
Aleksey Koltsov (1808–1842), Russian poet
Boris Koltsov (b. 1988), Russian darts player
Kirill Koltsov (b. 1983), Russian ice hockey player
Konstantin Koltsov (b. 1981), Belorussian ice hockey player
Mikhail Koltsov (1898–1940), Soviet journalist
Mykola Koltsov (1936–2011), Soviet association football player
Nikolai Koltsov (1872–1940), Soviet/Russian biologist
Olena Koltsova (b. 1972), Ukrainian Olympic fencer
Pāvels Koļcovs (Pavel Koltsov) (b. 1982), Latvian association football player

See also
Koltsovo (disambiguation)

References

Russian-language surnames